Vassacher See is a small lake north of the Carinthian city of Villach, Austria.

External links
 Information from the Carinthian Institute of Limnology

Lakes of Carinthia (state)